7 Days is the fourth mixtape by British rap duo Krept and Konan. It is part of a dual-release alongside 7 Nights, released on 20 October 2017 by Virgin EMI. The mixtape includes guest appearances from Skepta, Abra Cadabra, J Hus and Stormzy. It was supported by the lead single "Wo Wo Wo".

Singles
The lead single "Wo Wo Wo" was released on 29 September 2017 for streaming and digital download. It peaked at number 71 on the UK Singles Chart.

Track listing

Charts

Certifications

References

2017 mixtape albums
Krept and Konan albums